Malyye Doldy is a rural locality (a village) in Cherdynsky District, Perm Krai, Russia. The population was 5 as of 2010.

Geography 
Malyye Doldy is located 140 km southwest of Cherdyn (the district's administrative centre) by road. Bolshiye Doldy is the nearest rural locality.

References 

Rural localities in Cherdynsky District